Berlin Metropolitan School is an international school in Mitte, Berlin, Germany, serving kindergarten through grade 12.  there are 1,055 students originating from 78 countries.
It is a private school that charges an enrolment fee of 1,100 € and monthly tuition of ~€700 to 1,200 €.

Criticism 
In 2018 there was an incident involving a teacher at the school, which was also investigated by the public school authorities with regard to discrimination and racism at the school.

In a scientific 2016 study, two researchers from the WZB Berlin Social Science Center (WZB) found out that Berlin's private schools, including the Berlin Metropolitan School, were charging too high fees from parents. This violates the principle enshrined in the German constitution that "a segregation of school students according to the parents' wealth is not appropriate". The scientists came to the conclusion that the school should never have been granted a permit. This accusation was taken up in public and led to an intensified Governmental review of the school.

References

External links
 Berlin Metropolitan School

International schools in Berlin